KOPW is a championship created and promoted by the Japanese professional wrestling promotion New Japan Pro-Wrestling (NJPW).

KOPW follows a non-traditional formula: it has no title belt, and only one wrestler per year is recognized as champion. A "provisional champion" is first determined; during the year, the provisional champion must defend his provisional title. The provisional champion at the end of the year is officially recognized as the year's official champion and wins the KOPW Trophy. Furthermore, in contrast with NJPW's heavy focus on traditional matches, the title matches are exclusively focused on non-regular stipulations. Each of the wrestlers involved in a title match proposes a stipulation, and fans vote to select which is followed.

The title was created by professional wrestler Kazuchika Okada, who introduced it during a press conference on July 28, 2020. Toru Yano became the first provisional champion on August 29, 2020, and the first official champion after a final title defense on December 23, 2020.

Concept 
The title is inactive at the beginning of a new year. At some later point, a provisional champion is determined, who is not recognized by NJPW as an actual champion. During the rest of the year, the provisional champion must defend the title against contenders; if he fails, a new provisional champion is crowned, and must similarly defend the title against new contenders. At some point close to the end of the year, a final title match takes place; the winner of the match becomes recognized as that year's KOPW, and is awarded the KOPW Trophy.

While NJPW has historically focused heavily on traditional matches (either classic singles or tag team matches without special stipulations), KOPW matches will focus exclusively on non-regular stipulations such as matches with more than two individual competitors at the same time, two out of three falls matches, ladder matches, or steel cage matches. Each of the matches' participants can propose a stipulation, and the fans vote to select which stipulation the match will follow.

Despite its unique concept, KOPW is recognized as an actual championship (rather than a tournament or other non-conventional accolade) by NJPW. The name of the title changes based on the year, with the 2020 version of the title being named KOPW 2020. It is "reset" every year, and the process is repeated until a new champion is crowned.

On December 22, 2022, NJPW revealed a championship belt to replace the trophy, which had been broken and vandalized multiple times. The belt will be presented to the first provisional champion of 2023, to be determined at Wrestle Kingdom 17 in the New Japan Rumble on January 4, 2023 in Tokyo, with the last four competitors remaining wrestle in a four-way match at New Year Dash!!.

History

Creation 
At Sengoku Lord in Nagoya on July 25, 2020, professional wrestler Kazuchika Okada teased "a controversial announcement." On July 28, during a press conference in Tokyo, NJPW chairman Naoki Sugabayashi announced the creation of a new title following an idea by Okada; Okada then proceeded to introduce the title and its concept, also announcing KOPW 2021 for the following year. Comparing it to other NJPW titles, Okada claimed that KOPW "exists on the edge of New Japan."

KOPW 2020 
In the same conference he introduced the title, Okada announced that from August 26 onwards during the Summer Struggle tour, eight men will compete in four first-round singles matches. The four winners then competed in a four-way match to determine the inaugural provisional KOPW 2020 on August 29 at the Meiji Jingu Stadium in Tokyo, during the Summer Struggle in Jingu event.

On August 6, 2020, Okada himself and Yujiro Takahashi were announced as the first two entrants in the tournament. Eventually, the eight match-ups were announced: Okada vs. Takahashi, Toru Yano vs. Bushi, El Desperado vs. Satoshi Kojima, and Sanada vs. Sho. Fans voted for the stipulations online on the social networking service Twitter; the polls closed on August 24, with over 170,000 fan votes cast. As Sanada and Sho had both picked submission match as their wanted stipulation, no vote was needed for their match.

In the first round, El Desperado defeated Kojima by disqualification in a No finisher match, Yano defeated Bushi in a Two-count Pinfalls match, Sanada defeated Sho in their Submission match, and finally Okada defeated Takahashi, who had teamed up with Jado & Gedo, in a 1 vs 3 handicap match.

At Summer Struggle in Jingu, Yano won the four-way match by pinning Okada to become the inaugural provisional champion.

Reigns 

Note that this list follows the title's history, including provisional champions; however, only the person winning the final title defense of the year is actually recognized as champion.

Combined reigns 

Note that this includes both provisional and official champions.

References

External links
NJPW.co.jp

New Japan Pro-Wrestling championships